Amith Eranda Ponnayo (born 6 April 1989) is a Sri Lankan cricketer. He made his List A debut for Matale District in the 2016–17 Districts One Day Tournament on 18 March 2017. He made his Twenty20 debut on 22 May 2022, for Sri Lanka Navy Sports Club in the Major Clubs T20 Tournament.

References

External links
 

1989 births
Living people
Sri Lankan cricketers
Matale District cricketers
Sri Lanka Navy Sports Club cricketers